North Carolina Highway 13 may refer to:
North Carolina Highway 13 (1921–1930), First incarnation NC 13 running between Durham and Roxboro.
North Carolina Highway 13 (1934–1935), Short lived second incarnation running between Raleigh and Creedmoor.
North Carolina Highway 13 (1935–1951), Third incarnation of NC 13 running from US 220 near Seagrove to US 421 near Staley.

See also
U.S. Route 13 in North Carolina, current day "highway 13" in North Carolina

013